Nadine Barrie Smith (1962–2010) was an American biomedical researcher in the field of therapeutic ultrasound and non-invasive drug delivery. She was also an educator and mentor, especially to women students.

Personal life

Smith was born in Chicago, Illinois to Jean and Barron Smith. The family has deep roots in Japan (Sendai and Yokohama), associated with the  Sekiguchi and Asaki clans. She has two sisters, Arnette Bosch and Jolene Smith. She graduated from Chicago’s Lane Tech High School in 1980. She was married to Andrew Webb in New Zealand. Outside of her scientific career, she was an accomplished sports photographer, equestrian, and mountaineer.  Dr. Nadine Barrie Smith died unexpectedly at her home in Pine Grove Mills, PA, on April 2, 2010.

Education
Smith earned a bachelor of science degree in computer science at the University of Illinois at Urbana-Champaign (UIUC) in 1985, a master's degree in electrical and computer engineering at UIUC in 1989, with the thesis Automated Ultrasonic Exposure System to Assess the Effects of In Utero Diagnostic Ultrasound.  She received her PhD in biophysics at UIUC in 1996. Her dissertation was titled  Effect of myofibril length and tissue constituents on acoustic propagation properties of muscle.

Awards
During this time she was honored with several awards, including the IEEE Ultrasonics, Ferroelectrics, and Frequency Control Society Award (1994), UIUC Outstanding Teaching Recognition Award (1995-1996), and Panhellenic Association of the University of Illinois Outstanding Staff Member Award (1995). She was also elected to Sigma Xi, The Scientific Research Society (1996).

Research
Smith worked on a three-year postdoctoral fellowship with Professor Kullervo Hynynen in the Radiology Department at Brigham and Women's Hospital, Harvard Medical School, where she developed an intracavitary ultrasound hyperthermia array used for human prostate cancer treatments. Her major contributions included the first MRI-guided closed-loop feedback control of high intensity focused ultrasound treatment (see Works below), which has since developed into an important clinical procedure.

From 1999 through 2010, Smith was a faculty member in the Department of Bioengineering at Pennsylvania State University. She was involved in several programs in Penn State’s College of Engineering, including the Graduate Program in Acoustics, the Materials Research Institute, and the Penn State Diabetes Center. She was promoted to full Professor in 2010. Her research concentrated on ultrasound for cancer treatment and noninvasive drug delivery. She published more than fifty papers in both areas (see Works, below). She collaborated with Focus Surgery, Inc., the makers of the Sonoblate®500 and with Piezo Resonance Innovations (now Actuated Medical, Inc.) on SBIR funding from the National Institutes of Health.

Smith’s work has also been publicized in the popular press both nationally and internationally with her research in needleless insulin delivery and glucose sensing for diabetes.

In 2009/2010 she spent a sabbatical year at the Leiden University Medical Center where she was involved in several projects involving high field human magnetic resonance imaging.

In addition to teaching medical imaging and medical instrumentation classes, Smith designed and developed the capstone Senior Design course for the Bioengineering curriculum at Penn State.

In 2009, Smith was commissioned by Cambridge University Press to co-author an engineering textbook entitled, "Introduction to Medical Imaging: Physics, Engineering and Clinical Applications", which was published in 2011.

Smith was the Co-Chair of the International Association of Science and Technology for Development Signal and Image Processing conference in 2009, the course program co-organizer on RF Coil Design for the European Society for Magnetic Resonance in Medicine and Biology, a member of the Scientific & Technical Program Committee and Student Research Competition (Chair) for the International Society of Therapeutic Ultrasound conference, and an Associate Editor for the Institute of Electrical and Electronics Engineers Transactions on Ultrasonics, Ferroelectronics, and Frequency Control. She was an elected member of both the Bioeffects and Technical Standards Committees of the American Institute of Ultrasound in Medicine.

Legacy

 The Nadine Barrie Smith Memorial Fund and the Nadine Barrie Smith Memorial Fellows Program for female graduate students have been established at the Beckman Institute at the University of Illinois at Urbana-Champaign.
 An undergraduate award, "The Nadine Barrie Smith and Andrew Webb Undergraduate Scholarship for Female Engineers", has been established for promising students with financial needs in the College of Engineering at the University of Illinois at Urbana-Champaign.
 The  Nadine Barrie Smith Student Award for the International Society of Therapeutic Ultrasound (ISTU) annual conference has been established in her honor.
 The Nadine Barrie Smith Mentor Award for mentoring female engineering undergraduate students has been established at Penn State University.
 The conference room at the C. J. Gorter Center for High Field Magnetic Resonance in the Department of Radiology at the Leiden University Medical Center (The Netherlands) has been dedicated to Smith.

Publications

 Dimitrov, I. E., Douglas, D., Ren, J., Smith, N. B., Webb, A. G., Sherry, A. D., and Malloy, C. R. In vivo determination of human breast fat composition by 1H magnetic resonance spectroscopy at 7 T. Magn.Reson.Med. 67:1, 20-26, 2012. 
 Miller, D. L., Smith, N. B., Bailey, M. R, Czarnota, G. J., Hynynen, K., and Makin, I. R. S. (2012). Overview of therapeutic ultrasound applications and safety considerations. J. of Ultrasound in Medicine, 2012:31(4), 623-634.
 Smith, N. B. and Webb, A. (2011). Introduction to medical imaging: Physics, engineering, and clinical applications. New York: Cambridge University Press. .
 Snaar, J. E. M., Teeuwisse, W. M., Versluis, M. J., van Buchem, M. A., Kan, H. E., Smith, N. B., and Webb, A. G. Increased signal-to-noise and improved determination of metabolite concentrations in high field localized MR spectroscopy of the temporal lobe in humans using new deformable high-dielectric materials, NMR in Biomedicine, 24, 873-879, 2011.
 Webb, A. G., Smith, N. B., Aussenhofer, S. and Kan, H. E. Use of tailored higher modes of a birdcage to a simple double-tuned proton/phosphorus coil for human calf muscle studies at 7T, Magnetic Resonance in Engineering, 39B, 89-97, 2011.
 Brandts, A., Westenberg, J. J. M., Versluis, M. J., Kroft, L. J. M., Smith, N. B., Webb, A. G., and de Roos, A. Quantitative assessment of left ventricular function in humans at 7T, Magn.Reson.Med, 64, 1471-1477, 2010.
 Webb, A. G., Collins, C. M., Versluis, M. J., Kan, H. E., and Smith, N. B. MRI and localized proton spectroscopy in human leg muscle at 7 tesla using longitudinal traveling waves. Mag. Res. Med., 63:2, 297-302, February 2010. .
 Haines, K., Smith, N. B., and Webb, A. G. New high dielectric constant materials for tailoring the B1+ distribution at high magnetic fields, J.Magn.Reson, 203, 323-327, 2010.
 van Elderen, S. G. C., Versluis, M. J., Westenberg, J. J. M., Agarwal, H., Smith, N. B., Stuber, M., de Roos, A., and Webb, A. G. Right coronary MR angiography at 7 T: A direct quantitative and qualitative comparison with 3 T in young healthy volunteers. Radiology, 257(1): 254–259, 2010. . .
 van Elderen, S. G. C., Webb, A. G., Versluis, M. J., Westenberg, J., Doornbos, J., Smith, N. B., de Roos, A., and Stuber, M. In vivo human coronary magnetic resonance angiography at 7 Tesla. J. Cardiovascular Mag. Res., 2009, .
 Park, E.J., Werner, J., Beebe, J., Chan, S. and Smith, N. B. “Noninvasive ultrasonic glucose sensing on large pigs (~ 200 lbs) using a lightweight cymbal transducer array and biosensors,”Journal of Diabetes Science and Technology, 2009:3(3), 517-523.
 Versluis, M. J., Tsekos, N., Smith, N. B., and Webb, A. G. Simple RF design for human functional and morphological cardiac imaging at 7 Tesla, J.Magn.Reson, 200, 161-166, 2009.
 Park, E. J., Dodds, J., Smith, N.B., "Dose comparison of ultrasonic transdermal insulin delivery to subcutaneous insulin injection", Nanomedicine, 2008:3(3) 335–341.
 Smith, N.B., "Applications of ultrasonic skin permeation in transdermal drug delivery", invited, Expert Opinion on Drug Delivery, 5(10):1-14, 2008.
 Tran, M. A., Gowda, R., Sharma, A., Park, E., Adair, J., Kester, M., Smith, N. B., and Robertson, G. P. Targeting V600EB-Raf and Akt3 Using Nanoliposomal-Small Interfering RNA Inhibits Cutaneous Melanocytic Lesion Development. Cancer Res, September 15, 2008 68; 7638. .
 Fu, J.Y., Zhu, W., Li, N., Smith, N.B., Cross, E.L., "Gradient scaling phenomenon in micro-size flexoelectric piezoelectric composites" Applied Physics Letters, 2007:91, pp. 1829101–3, 2007.
 Luis, J., Park, E.J., Meyer, R.J., Smith, N.B., "Rectangular cymbal arrays for improved ultrasonic transdermal insulin delivery", Journal of the Acoustical Society of America, 122 (4), October 2007.
 Park, E. J., Werner, J. and Smith, N.B., "Noninvasive ultrasound transdermal insulin delivery using large pigs", Pharmaceutical Research, 2007, invited, .
 Smith, N.B., "Perspectives on Transdermal Ultrasound Mediated Drug Delivery", invited, Nanomedicine, 2(4), 1-10, 2007.
 Snyder, B., Lee, S, Newnham, R. and Smith, N.B. Application of the Cymbal Transducer Towards Noninvasive Transdermal Insulin Delivery. Journal of Materials Science -Frontiers of Research in Ferroelectricity - Special Issue, 2007.
 Snyder, B., Lee, S., Smith, N. B., and Newnham, R. Ferroelectric transducer arrays for transdermal insulin delivery. Frontiers of Ferroelectricity, 2007, 211-216. .
 Al-Bataineh, O. M., Collins, C. M., Park, E. J., Lee, H., and Smith, N. B. MR thermometry characterization of a hyperthermia ultrasound array designed using the k-space computational method. BioMedical Engineering OnLine 2006, 5:56 .
 Lee, S, Nayak V, Dodds J, Pisko M and Smith NB, "Ultrasonic Mediated Glucose Measurements in vivo using the Cymbal Array", Ultrasound in Medicine and Biology, 31(7), pp 971–977, 2005.
 Salehl, K. Y. and Smith, N. B. A 63 element 1.75 dimensional ultrasound phased array for the treatment of benign prostatic hyperplasia. BioMedical Engineering OnLine 2005, 4:39 
 Lee, S, Snyder, B., Newnham, R. and Smith, N.B., "Noninvasive Ultrasonic Transdermal Insulin Delivery in Rabbits Using the Light Weight Cymbal Array," Diabetes Technology & Therapeutics, Volume 6 / Issue 6, December 2004.
 Smith, N.B., Merrilees, N.K., Dahleh, M. and Hynynen, K, Design of Control Systems for Focused and Unfocused Intracavitary Ultrasound Arrays for the Thermal Treatment of Prostate Disease, International Journal of Hyperthermia, 17 (3), 271-282, 2001
 Smith, N.B., Temkin M.T., Shapiro, F., and Hynynen, K, Thermal Effects of Focused Ultrasound Energy on Bone Tissue, Ultrasound in Medicine and Biology, 27 (10), 1427-1433, 2001.
 Daum, D.R., Smith, N.B., King, R. and Hynynen, K. In vivo demonstration of non-invasive, thermal surgery of the liver and kidney using an ultrasonic phased array, Ultrasound in Medicine and Biology, Vol. 25, No. 7, pp. 1087-1098, 1999.
 Smith, N.B., Buchanan M.T., and Hynynen, K, Transrectal Ultrasound Applicator for Prostate Heating Monitored Using MRI Thermometry, International Journal of Radiation Oncology / Biology / Physics, vol. 43, no.1, pp. 219–225, 1999.
 Smith, N.B. and Hynynen, K, The Feasibility of Using Focused Ultrasound for Transmyocardial Revascularization, Ultrasound in Medicine and Biology, Vol. 24, No. 7, pp. 1045–1054, 1998.

References

1962 births
2010 deaths
Biotechnologists
Women biotechnologists
20th-century women scientists